Teracotona metaxantha is a moth in the family Erebidae. It was described by George Hampson in 1920. It is found in South Africa and Zimbabwe.

References

Moths described in 1920
Spilosomina